The risk-need-responsivity model is a model used in criminology to develop recommendations for how prisoners should be assessed based on the risk they present and what they need, and what kinds of environments they should be placed in to reduce recidivism. It was first proposed in 1990 based on the research conducted on classifications of offender treatments by Lee Sechrest and Ted Palmer, among other researchers, in the 1960s and 70s. It was primarily developed by Canadian researchers James Bonta, Donald A. Andrews, and Paul Gendreau. It has been considered the best model that exists for determining offender treatment, and some of the best risk-assessment tools used on offenders are based on it.

Core principles
According to the model, there are three main principles that should guide interventions for helping offenders reduce involvement in crime:

 Risk principle: Offenders differ in their risk of recidivism, therefore different kinds of interventions are appropriate. When the risk is low, complex (and expensive) interventions may be unreasonable. On the other hand, for high-risk offenders intensive interventions are likely necessary to induce any kind of change.
 Need principle: Every offender naturally has their own set of dynamic risk factors or criminogenic needs. When changed, they predict changes in reoffending rates. Therefore, interventions should target these individual needs for best results.
 Responsivity principle: Thirdly, different modes of intervention differ in their effectiveness of reducing recidivism. Generally, behavioural and cognitive-behavioural interventions are preferred. There is also an interaction with attributes of the offender: depending on e.g. age, gender, cognitive abilities or motivation different kinds of interventions are indicated.

References

Criminology